Hypatopa mora is a moth in the family Blastobasidae. It is found in Costa Rica.

The length of the forewings is about 7.2 mm. The basal third of the forewings is pale brown and the apical two thirds is brown intermixed with brown scales tipped with pale brown. The hindwings are translucent pale brown, slightly darkening towards the apex.

Etymology
The specific name is derived from Latin mora (meaning a delay).

References

Moths described in 2013
Hypatopa